Battle of Dalton may refer to:

First Battle of Dalton, American Civil War battle fought between February 22 and 27, 1864, in Whitfield County, Georgia
Second Battle of Dalton, American Civil War battle fought between August 14 and 15, 1864, in Whitfield County, Georgia

See also
Battle of Rocky Face Ridge, operations near Dalton on or about May 7, 1864, in Whitfield County, Georgia; an early stage in Sherman's Atlanta Campaign